The ECB National Club Cricket Championship is a forty over limited overs knockout club cricket competition in England. The most successful clubs have been Scarborough, from North Yorkshire, with five titles and Old Hill, from Staffordshire, with four. The 2019 champions were Swardeston, after they beat Nantwich by 53 runs in the final; the competition was not played in 2020 due to the COVID-19 pandemic.

The competition was originally only open to "senior" cricket sides (sides playing in the senior county leagues) and in 1972 the National Village Cup competition was formed for village sides unable to enter this competition. In 1997 the ECB released a blueprint to the future of cricket written by Lord MacLaurin called "Raising the Standards", the report suggested counties created county board ran leagues, designed to raise the standard of club cricket and bridge the gap between Club and county cricket. This formed the creation of the ECB Premier Leagues. As part of this new structure, the tournament aligned itself with the ECB Premier League and the requirement of entry to the competition changed to that you had to be in an ECB Premier League. This entry requirement is still in place to this day.

The format has largely stayed the same from the initial season to the present day. All teams are split into 16 regional knockouts, with the 16 winners going into a national round.

Winners

Source:

Competition name
Due to sponsorship, the competition has been known by the following names:

See also 
 Village cricket

References

External links
 ECB National Club Cricket Championship

English domestic cricket competitions
Club cricket